Lolans is a 2018 Indian Malayalam-language film directed by Salim Baba and produced by K. P. Suneer. The screenplay was written by Santhosh Ram from a story by Suneer. The film stars Nishan, Carolina, and P. Balachandran in the lead roles along with Kottayam Nazeer, Sasi Kalinga, Sunil Sukhada, Jayan, Balaji, Saju Kodiyan, Spadikam George, Abu Salim, Ambika Mohan, Indrans, Kalarenjini, and Niharika. The music was composed by Anwar Aman.

Plot 
The story is based in Areekode village. It revolves around the life of four youngsters, who are unable to express their love. The story goes through each of their love stories and is portrayed in a comedic manner.

Cast 
 Nishan
 Carolina
 P. Balachandran
 Kottayam Nazeer
 Kalinga Sasi
 Sunil Sukhada
 Jayan
 Balaji
 Saju Kodiyan
 Spadikam George
 Abu Salim
 Ambika Mohan
 Indrans
 Kalarenjini
 Niharika
 Shiyas Kareem

Soundtrack 
The music is composed by Anwar Aman along with Sachin Warrier, Durga Viswanat, Najeem Arshan, Durga Viswanath, Pradeep Babu and Mansoor Ibrahim

 "Ariyathe Ennnil"- Sachin Warrier
"Paaridamonnake"- Durga Viswanat, Chorus
"Iiaveyile"- Najeem Arshan, Durga Viswanath
"Ooru Chuttum"- Pradeep Babu, Mansoor Ibrahim
"Manjuthulliyo"- Niranj Suresh
"Ariyathe"- Durga Viswanath

References

External links 
 

2018 films
2010s Malayalam-language films